SAAESP (an acronym for Autonomous Service of Water and Sewage of São Pedro) is a Brazilian state owned utility that provides water and sewage services for residential, commercial and  industrial use to the municipality of São Pedro.

References

External links
  Official Home Page

Service companies of Brazil
Companies based in São Paulo (state)